Manenberg Secondary School is a school in the Western Cape.

History
The school was established in 1976 under the Apartheid Government.

External links

1976 establishments in South Africa
Educational institutions established in 1976
High schools in South Africa
Schools in the Western Cape